Gmina Lwówek Śląski is an urban-rural gmina (administrative district) in Lwówek Śląski County, Lower Silesian Voivodeship, in south-western Poland.

Neighbouring gminas
Gmina Lwówek Śląski is bordered by the gminas of Bolesławiec, Gryfów Śląski, Lubomierz, Nowogrodziec, Pielgrzymka, Warta Bolesławiecka and Wleń.

Villages
Apart from the town of Lwówek Śląski, the gmina contains the villages of Bielanka, Brunów, Chmielno, Dębowy Gaj, Dłużec, Dworek, Gaszów, Górczyca, Gradówek, Kotliska, Mojesz, Nagórze, Niwnice, Pieszków, Płóczki Dolne, Płóczki Górne, Radłówka, Radomiłowice, Rakowice Małe, Rakowice Wielkie, Skała, Skorzynice, Sobota, Ustronie, Włodzice Małe, Włodzice Wielkie, Zbylutów and Żerkowice.

Twin towns – sister cities

Gmina Lwówek Śląski is twinned with:

 Chrastava, Czech Republic (2007)
 Heidenau, Germany (1995)
 Lwówek, Poland (2003)
 Noidans-lès-Vesoul, France (2006)
 Velký Šenov, Czech Republic (2000)
 Wilthen, Germany (2009)

References

Lwowek Slaski
Lwówek Śląski County